Lingaiah may refer to:
 Allu Rama Lingaiah (1922–2004), Indian actor
 Chirumarthi Lingaiah (born 2000s), Indian politician